Melissa Pam Gaston (née Ordway; born March 31, 1983) is an American actress and model. She has been featured in campaigns by a number of major brands including Skechers, Old Navy, David's Bridal, Anchor Blue and Tillys. She is best known for portraying Abby Newman on the CBS soap opera The Young and the Restless. In May 2022, she was nominated for an Emmy for Best Supporting Actress in a Daytime Drama for her portrayal of Abby Newman on The Young and the Restless.

Early life
Ordway was born in Atlanta, Georgia, an only child, to John and Christine Ordway. She began doing community theatre in Atlanta and also acting in theatre productions at her high school in Snellville, Georgia. She starred in the stage performances of Beauty and the Beast, The Women, A Midsummer Night's Dream, and many other shows. After graduating from high school, Ordway attended Georgia State University and is a member of the Delta Zeta sorority. While at Georgia State, Ordway was chosen to participate in a reality show on MTV called The Assistant. She won the show and moved to Los Angeles to pursue a career in acting and modeling.

Career

Modeling
She is signed with Nous Model Management in Los Angeles and Front Management in Miami. She has been featured in campaigns for several brands including Skechers, Old Navy, David's Bridal, Anchor Blue. Tillys, Kirstie Kelly and Fabrizio Gianni. She has appeared in television commercials for Axe, Geico Cavemen, Pontiac Vibe, Carl's Jr. and Payless.

She has also appeared on the cover Los Angeles Weddings Magazine, Grand Sierra Magazine and Hona Hou Magazine. She is featured as a frequent guest model on the game show The Price is Right including the week of October 7, 2015.

Acting
Melissa Ordway's first major acting part was the recurring roles of Jordanna on The CW television series Privileged. Ordway's feature film debut was in 17 Again. She has guest starred on such television shows as Entourage and How I Met Your Mother, as well as starring in several independent films including Callers, Tales of an Ancient Empire and I Heart Veronica Martin. In 2010, Ordway appeared in the film The Last Song as Ashley and guest starred on Melrose Place as Morgan McKellan. She starred in the fantasy thriller film Tales of an Ancient Empire. In 2011, she co-starred in Escapee and appeared in Ted directed by Seth MacFarlane.

She was cast in the main role of Chloe Carter on the TeenNick series Hollywood Heights in 2012. In March 2013, Ordway was cast in the role of Abby Newman on the CBS soap opera The Young and the Restless, replacing previous actress Marcy Rylan. She also appeared in the 2013 supernatural thriller film Odd Thomas as Lysette.

Personal life 
On September 22, 2012, she married actor Justin Gaston, whom she met during the filming of Escapee. In 2016, Justin and Melissa adopted their first child, a daughter named Olivia Christine, born April 2016. Melissa gave birth to a daughter, their second child, Sophie Jolie, on December 9, 2017.

Filmography

References

External links
 
 
 Fashion Model Directory
 Nous Models

1983 births
Living people
Actresses from Atlanta
American female models
American film actresses
American television actresses
Georgia State University alumni
21st-century American actresses
People from Snellville, Georgia
American soap opera actresses